The National Breast Cancer Coalition (NBCC) is a grassroots advocacy organization that combines the power of advocacy, education, policy, and research to unite around the goal of ending breast cancer.

It was founded in 1991 by a group of breast cancer survivors including President Fran Visco. Coalition members include breast cancer support, information and service groups, as well as the women's health and provider organizations.

Philosophy 
Founded in 1991, the National Breast Cancer Coalition (NBCC) is a collaboration of activists, survivors, researchers, policy-makers, grassroots groups and national organizations that have come together as disruptive innovators for social change.

They link hundreds of organizations and tens of thousands of individuals from across the country into a dynamic, diverse coalition that gives breast cancer a meaningful voice in Washington, D.C., and state capitals; in laboratories and health care institutions; and in local communities everywhere.

Organizational Goals 
NBCC is guided by three primary goals:

 Research: Promote research into the cause of, and optimal preventive and treatment interventions for, breast cancer through increased federal funding, fostering of innovation and collaborative approaches and improved accountability.
 Access: Improve access to quality breast cancer care for all women and men, from appropriate screening policies through diagnosis, treatment and care—particularly for the underserved and uninsured—through legislation and change in systems of delivery of health care.
 Influence: Educate and empower women and men as advocates, increasing the involvement and influence of those living with breast cancer and other breast cancer activists wherever and whenever breast cancer decisions are made.

Funding

NBCC is supported through grants, contributions from individuals, corporate sponsorships and special events. The organization encourages advocates and businesses across the country to organize fundraising events.

The National Breast Cancer Coalition  meets all 20 Better Business Bureau Charity Standards, has received an “A” rating from CharityWatch and is ranked three stars by Charity Navigator.

References 

"Charity Reviews". give_org. Retrieved 2021-11-12.

"National Breast Cancer Coalition Fund". www.charitywatch.org. Retrieved 2021-11-12.

"Charity Navigator - Rating for National Breast Cancer Coalition Fund". www.charitynavigator.org. Retrieved 2021-11-12.

External links
 National Breast Cancer Coalition official website

Breast cancer organizations
Cancer charities in the United States
Medical and health organizations based in Washington, D.C.